The Philadelphia Public School District is a public school district based in Philadelphia, Mississippi, United States.

It includes most of the Philadelphia city limits.

Schools
The schools include Philadelphia High School, Philadelphia Middle School, Philadelphia Elementary School, and Vo-Tech.

Demographics

2006-07 school year
There were a total of 1,191 students enrolled in the Philadelphia Public School District during the 2006–2007 school year. The gender makeup of the district was 50% female and 50% male. The racial makeup of the district was 68.09% African American, 28.80% White, 1.09% Hispanic, 0.42% Asian, and 1.60% Native American. 65.2% of the district's students were eligible to receive free lunch.

Previous school years

Accountability statistics

Notable alumni

Iris Kelso (Class of 1944), Louisiana journalist
Marcus Dupree (Class of 1982), American football player
Adam M. Byrd (Class of 1877), U.S. Representative
Marty Stuart, American Country Music Singer/Songwriter
C.J. Johnson (Class of 2011), [American football] player

See also

List of school districts in Mississippi

References

External links
 

Education in Neshoba County, Mississippi
School districts in Mississippi
Philadelphia, Mississippi